Harry William Morrey Bamford, CBE, MC (1882 – 25 August 1968) was a British police office and was the Inspector General of Police of the Gold Coast Police Service from 27 August 1924 to 3 January 1938.

References

1882 births
1968 deaths
Commanders of the Order of the British Empire
Ghanaian Inspector Generals of Police
Ghanaian police officers
British colonial police officers
British people in the British Gold Coast